Colin James Rose (born 22 January 1972) is an English former professional footballer who played as a midfielder in the Football League for Crewe Alexandra and Macclesfield Town. He was in the starting eleven for Macclesfield's debut in the Football League, on 9 August 1997 at home to Torquay United. He also played non-league football for clubs including Witton Albion, Congleton Town, Gateshead, Runcorn, Northwich Victoria, Leek Town, Winsford United, and Middlewich Town. In 1996, Rose was capped twice for the England semi-pro national team.

References

1972 births
Living people
People from Winsford
English footballers
Association football midfielders
Crewe Alexandra F.C. players
Witton Albion F.C. players
Congleton Town F.C. players
Macclesfield Town F.C. players
Gateshead F.C. players
Runcorn F.C. Halton players
Northwich Victoria F.C. players
Leek Town F.C. players
Winsford United F.C. players
Middlewich Town F.C. players
English Football League players
National League (English football) players
Northern Premier League players
England semi-pro international footballers